Three Lakes is a census-designated place (CDP) in Miami-Dade County, Florida, United States. The population was 16,540 at the 2020 census, up from 15,047 in 2010. Its name comes from the planned community of Three Lakes, which is located inside Three Lakes CDP boundaries.

Geography
It is bordered to the north by The Crossings, to the northeast by Kendall, to the east by Richmond Heights, to the south by Zoo Miami, and to the west by Country Walk. The Hammocks touches the northwest corner of Three Lakes, and Palmetto Estates touches the southeast corner.

Neighborhoods
The three main neighborhoods in the Three Lakes CDP are Deerwood, Three Lakes, and Bonita Lakes.

Points of interest
Three Lakes has a handful of churches, schools, and strip malls scattered around.

Demographics

2020 census

As of the 2020 United States census, there were 16,540 people, 4,830 households, and 3,769 families residing in the CDP.

2000 census
As of the census of 2000, there were 6,955 people, 2,463 households, and 1,889 families residing in the CDP. The racial makeup of the CDP was 72.49% White (of which 31.6% were Non-Hispanic White,) 15.64% African American, 0.12% Native American, 3.87% Asian, 0.01% Pacific Islander, 4.10% from other races, and 3.77% from two or more races. Hispanic or Latino of any race were 47.76% of the population.

There were 2,463 households, out of which 44.8% had children under the age of 18 living with them, 56.4% were married couples living together, 15.8% had a female householder with no husband present, and 23.3% were non-families. 16.9% of all households were made up of individuals, and 2.1% had someone living alone who was 65 years of age or older.  The average household size was 2.82 and the average family size was 3.19.

In the CDP, the population was spread out, with 28.3% under the age of 18, 9.4% from 18 to 24, 40.8% from 25 to 44, 16.1% from 45 to 64, and 5.4% who were 65 years of age or older.  The median age was 31 years. For every 100 females, there were 90.4 males.  For every 100 females age 18 and over, there were 85.5 males.

The median income for a household in the CDP was $54,830, and the median income for a family was $58,424. Males had a median income of $37,194 versus $30,481 for females. The per capita income for the CDP was $22,832.  About 6.7% of families and 8.0% of the population were below the poverty line, including 8.0% of those under age 18 and 13.8% of those age 65 or over.

As of 2000, speakers of Spanish as a first language accounted for 51.87% of residents, while English made up 45.19%, and French was the mother tongue of 2.92% of the population.

References

Census-designated places in Miami-Dade County, Florida
Census-designated places in Florida